Bishop Michele Fusco is the current serving bishop of the Roman Catholic Diocese of Sulmona-Valva, Italy.

Early life and education 
He was born on 6 December 1963 in Piano di Sorrento, Italy.

Priesthood 
On 25 June 1988 he was ordained a priest by Archbishop Ferdinando Palatucci at Positano, Italy.

Episcopate 
Fusco was appointed bishop of Sulmona-Valva on 30 November 2017 by Pope Francis. He was consecrated a bishop by Crescenzio Cardinal Sepe on 4 January 2018 at Amalfi Cathedral.

References 

Living people
1963 births
21st-century Italian Roman Catholic bishops
Bishops appointed by Pope Francis
People from the Province of Naples